Anton Strle (21 January 1915 – 20 October 2003) was a Slovenian professor of dogmatic theology and a Catholic priest. He was born in the village of Osredek in the parish of Sveti Vid nad Cerknico. He was ordained priest in 1941 and received his D.D. degree in 1944 from the University of Ljubljana.

After World War II he spent many years in prison and in forced labour, falsely accused like many other priests in communist Yugoslavia. Later he worked as a parish administrator in Planina pri Rakeku. He lectured on dogmatics and patrology for forty years at the Faculty of Theology in Ljubljana.

All the time he was also active in pastoral work, for example in Holy Trinity parish in Ljubljana. He published 45 books and reproduced lecture notes for various fields of theology. He also translated several important works, for example Vera Cerkve (Denzinger's Enchiridion Symbolorum et Definitionum) and all the documents of the Second Vatican Council. For many years, he was a member of the doctrinal commission of the Yugoslav Bishops' Conference and a member of the International Theological Commission of the Holy See in Rome. In 1977, he was appointed a papal domestic prelate by Pope Paul VI.

In March 2015, his cause was officially opened by the Roman Catholic Archdiocese of Ljubljana. He is currently revered as a Servant of God.

References

Sources
 
  Spiritual family Work about Strle in Slovenian (Duhovna družina Delo o Strletu) 
 https://web.archive.org/web/20111002121121/http://www.informationdelight.info/encyclopedia/entry/Lloydminster%2C_Alberta/List_of_famous_Slovenians  Famous Slovenians
 http://www.ask.com/bar?q=Strle+Anton&page=2&qsrc=2457&dm=all&ab=5&u=http%3A%2F%2Fwww.experiencefestival.com%2F1941_-_january&sg=5qibydILkOTb6AqvUMCBfkkg0%2FpqULEDEF4gniypEcs%3D%0D%0A&tsp=1279403067422  Search ask about Strle Anton 
 http://www.sticna.com/vrtnice/profesor_anton_strle_1915_2003.html  Professor Anton Strle - On way to Roses (Lecture about Jesus's Heart) in Slovenian (Professor Anton Strle – Vrtnicam na pot)
 

1915 births
2003 deaths
20th-century Slovenian Roman Catholic priests
Slovenian theologians
International Theological Commission
University of Ljubljana alumni
Academic staff of the University of Ljubljana
Roman Catholic domestic prelates
Slovenian Servants of God
21st-century venerated Christians
People from the Municipality of Cerknica